Michel Daryl Araújo Villar (born 28 September 1996) is a Uruguayan professional footballer who plays as an attacking midfielder for Fluminense.

Career statistics

Club

Notes

References

External links

1996 births
Living people
Uruguayan footballers
Uruguayan expatriate footballers
Association football midfielders
Racing Club de Montevideo players
Villa Teresa players
Fluminense FC players
Al-Wasl F.C. players
Uruguayan Primera División players
Uruguayan Segunda División players
Campeonato Brasileiro Série A players
UAE Pro League players
Uruguayan expatriate sportspeople in Brazil
Expatriate footballers in Brazil
Expatriate footballers in the United Arab Emirates
Uruguayan expatriate sportspeople in the United Arab Emirates